Cham-e Heydar may refer to:
Cham-e Heydar, Isfahan
Cham-e Heydar, Kermanshah
Cham-e Heydar, Afrineh, Lorestan Province
Cham-e Heydar, Mamulan, Lorestan Province